Agartala is the capital and the largest city of the Indian state of Tripura, situated on the banks of Hoara River, about  east of the border with Bangladesh and about 2,499 km (1,52 mi) from the National Capital New Delhi. According to 2022 census, Agartala is the third-most populous city in Northeast India with a population of about 5.7 lakh (0.57 million). It is India's third international internet gateway and being developed under the Smart Cities Mission .

Etymology 
Agartala is a derivative of two words, namely agar, a valuable perfume and incense tree of genus Aquilaria, and the suffix tala, meaning underneath, a reference to the density of agarwood trees in the region. The agar tree is historically referred to in the story of the King Raghu who tied up his elephant's feet to an agar tree on the banks of River Lauhitya.

History

One of the earliest kings of Tripura was Patardan B.C. 1900, long before the Manikya Dynasty. According to folklore, Chitrarath, Drikpati, Dharmapha, Loknath Jivandharan were important kings during the time of B.C. in Agartala.

In the past, Tripura served as the capital to several Hindu kingdoms. Although a timeline of the rulers has not been found, records reveal that the area has been ruled by as many as 179 Hindu rulers, starting from the mythological King Druhya to the last King of Tripura, Kirit Bikram Kishore Manikya. Tripura also came under Mughal rule. The state came under the governance of the British in 1808.

Much later the ancient capital of the then princely state 'Swadhin Tripura' was at Rangamati (Udaipur, South Tripura) by the bank of the river Gomati. In 1760 it was shifted by the Maharaja Krishna Chandra Manikya Bahadur (r.1829–1849) of Manikya Dynasty to present old Agartala by the bank of the river Haora/Saidra and was named 'Haveli'. Due to frequent invasion of the Kukis and also to keep easy communication with the British Bengali, the Maharaja Krishna Chandra Manikya started the process of shifting the capital from Old Haveli to New Haveli (present Agartala) in 1849.

During the British Raj, Agartala was the capital of the 'Hill Tippera' state; it became a municipality in 1874–75, and in 1901 had a population of 9,513. The princely state always remained as cake piece to the British and many other invaders. For example, when Arakhan soldiers attacked the old capital of the state the king of Tripura responded by defeating the entire troop.
The Agartala Municipality was established during the reign of Maharaja Bir Chandra Manikya (1862–1896) within an area of  having a population of only 875 by a royal proclamation in the last part of 1871. A.W.S. Power, the first British political agent for Tipperah was also appointed as the Chairman of the Agartala Municipality in 1872 who held office from 1872 to 1873. The municipality located at the crossing of latitude N 23 –50' and longitude E 91-17' covering 3 km2 area during that period.

Bir Bikram Kishore Debbarman is called the founder of the planned city of Agartala. He had gone on a tour to the United Kingdom and was so impressed at the architecture that he started planning similar township in Agartala. During the 1940s the town was re-organised in a planned manner with new roads and a market building.

The estimated population of Agartala was 5,22,603 in 2014 after the municipal expansion (189,327 in the 2001 census).

From 1901 to 1971 the city did not experience notable progress in infrastructure development with only an 8 km2 of area but 1981 saw Agartala expanding and increasing its connectivity as well as businesses in various fields, the city area expanding to 58.84 km2, greater Agartala is planned as of 2011 with an additional of 92 km2. Agartala had a different type of history from the earlier times of the epic days as it was a princely state and was connected with Bangladesh. Though the East India Company had not arrived in the princely capital of the state but they always remained in a certain in capturing and ruling. The East India Company had set their base of North East India in the Assam province with Shillong as their capital.

The Nobel laureate Indian (Bengali) poet Rabindranath Tagore or Robindronath Thakur visited the city multiple times and built a house that still exists. The historical book Rajmala contains incidents and historical stories of Agartala.

Geography and climate

Agartala is situated on a plain land along the Haora River, although the city also extends to the low-lying hills on its northern parts.

Agartala has a monsoon influenced humid subtropical climate (Köppen Cwa) just short of being hot enough to qualify as a borderline tropical savanna (Aw)/tropical monsoon (Am) climate. Large amounts of rain fall all year except during the dry "winter" or "cool" season. The city experiences long, hot and wet summers, lasting from April to October. The best time to visit is from September to February. Summers are long and extremely hot with much sunlight and warm days. Rain is very common in this season and the city can be found flooded. The Haora River flows through the city and remains flooded with water during the time of monsoon.

Demographics
As of the 2011 Indian Census, Agartala had a total population of 400,004, of which 200,132 were males and 199,872 were females. The population within the age range of 0 to 6 year is 35,034. The total number of literates in Agartala was 344,711, which constituted 86.18% of the population with male literacy of 87.53% and female literacy of 84.82%. The effective literacy rate of 7+ population of Agartala was 94.5%, of which male literacy rate was 96.2% and female literacy rate was 92.8%. The sex ratio of Agartala is 999 females per 1,000 males. The Scheduled Castes and Scheduled Tribes are 77,663 and 19,767 respectively.

In 1941 Agartala had a population of 17,693. By 1991 the population had risen to 157,358.

Bengali, the official state language, is the dominant language in Agartala spoken by 363,363 people, while English is also a popular language in the state; Kokborok is spoken by 16,200 people in the city. According to the 2011 census, 94.09% of the population is Hindu, 4.37% Muslim, 0.99% Christian, and 0.28% Buddhist. The remainder of the population includes Sikhs, Jains, and other religions; 0.27%.

The city mainly consists of Bengalis and Tripuris. Bengali is widely spoken in the city as a result of the erstwhile regal patronage and high influx of Bengalis from Comilla, Sylhet, Noakhali, and Chittagong districts of Bangladesh. Durga Puja and Saraswati Puja are celebrated with great grandeur and ecstatic enthusiasm, which reflect the influence of the culture of the Bengalis. Hence, nearly every festivity attracts participation from citizens of diverse backgrounds.

There is also a growing population of Tripuri people in the city. Among the native Tripuri festivals, the most famous are Kharchi, Garia and Ker festivals and Tring, the Tripuri New year celebrations. The major areas where the Tripuri live are in the localities of Abhoynagar, Banamalipur, Krishnanagar, Nandannagar and Kunjaban areas who have started to mass migrate to Agartala from other parts of Tripura.

Agartala has emerged as one of the fastest-growing cities in the northeastern region of India today. The city area under the AMC has seen a consistent expansion in recent times with conglomeration of various industries and businesses shaping up. Poverty and literacy still remains a challenge for the governing bodies.

Localities
Agartala city consists of many paras, which means "locality" in Bengali. Each collection of neighbourhoods or para is usually also a municipal ward or division. There are 49 wards under the municipal corporation jurisdiction.

Banamalipur is an important business centre and a part of urban Agartala, which falls under the Agartala post office.  Dhaleswar is a locality in the state close to Banamalipur, under the east police station and Dhaleswar Post Office.

Pratapgar, Math Chowmuhani, Kashari Patti, and Ker Chowmuhani are some important places in the city. One of the largest banyan trees is located in Ker Chowmuhani. Under that tree lies the Shiv-Kali temple of Ker Chowmuhani. This is one of the most peaceful temples in Agartala. In local language Chowmuhani is an intersection of three or four roads, i.e., a place where a couple of roads are linked up across a particular point; in pure Bengali Chowmuhani is called "more".

Kaman Chowmuhani is the most important place and a part of the heart of the city. The name Kaman Chowmuhani is derived from the Bengali word Kaman meaning "Cannon" in English. It so happened when the king of Tripura Dhanya Manikya defeated the soldiers of Husain Shah in battle and forfeited their cannon which was later set up in this place from where its name is derived. The place along with its object is a unique icon of Agartala.

Krishnanagar is one of the most densely populated parts of the city. It encompasses  the most visited temples of Agartala like Jagannnatha temple, Laxminarayana temple, Durgabari temple and Alpkhbaba temple. Radha Nagar has a bus stand and it connects buses and other vehicles to the northern part of the state.

Shibnagar is another locality which connects the city to Maharaja Bir Bikram College, the oldest college of the state whereas Ramnagar is the most dense locality in Tripura. The rectangular gridiron network of Ramnagar dates from the eras of the Rajas, one of the earliest planned neighbourhood in the city. There are 12 divisions in this area and many clubs which organise Durga puja. Joynagar is another a locality in Agartala which has six lanes. There are four clubs which organise Durga puja. The closest landmark of Joynager is Battala market, one of the important business hubs in the state.

Abhoynagar and Arundhutinagar are two residential areas around the city and are densely populated, (Arundhutinagar) being located 5 km away from the city centre confining the railway station of the capital city.

Gol Bazar (Maharajganj bazar) is the most important business hub as well as the largest market in the state of Tripura. Products are exported to many Indian cities from this zone. The market was established by the king of Tripura before India's independence.

Gurkha Basti is one of the biggest slum areas in the city, a recent campaign has been launched by the state government to make the city slum free and hence relocation of its residents is underway. Kunjaban is a census town in west Tripura district, which mainly includes government buildings and localities. The secretariat and the seat of the state government is located in this area. New Capital Complex is located in Kunjaban and is a planned and modern area. The Secretariat and the State Assembly along with the new Governor House is located here.

College Tilla consists of the historic Maharaja Bir Bikram College which was set up by Maharaja Bir Bikram Kishore Manikya in 1947. It is surrounded by some localities and quarter complexes of many government employees.

MBB Club, Indranagar, Bholagiri and Bhati Abhoynagar are some residential places in the city.

79 Tilla is another important part of Agartala with major offices such as the BSNL Office, electric office, Geological Survey office and Quarters, and the AG Quarters. It is located 2.5 km approx from the heart of the city.

GB Bazar is another important market of this state which is located 2 km from the heart of the city. The Agartala Government Medical College is located here.

Amtali, Badhar Ghat, College Tilla, Jagaharimura, Lake Chowmuhani, Advisor Chowmuhani, Ganaraj Chowmuhani, Durjoynagar, Bardowali are some important places in the city.

Battala is the commercial area of the city, it is often called Bottala in Bengali and is also known as the electronics market of Agartala. Products are imported from surrounding countries and the cheapest variety of cloths and accessories are found. Battala also has a strong food market and is the second biggest market in Tripura after Gol Bazar.

Melarmath is one of the most important parts of the city and also the electronic business hub centre; the city center market as well as other prominent structures are located here. Melarmath Kali Bari temple is one of the widely known temples of Agartala.

Khayerpur and Chandrapur are located on the National Highway 8.

These areas are subdivided into residential blocks, such as Banamalipur which is divided into North Banamalipur, Madhya Banamlipur, South Banamalipur, etc.

City administration
The city is managed by the Agartala Municipal Corporation (AMC), which divides the city into 49 municipal wards under four zones: North, South, East and Central zones. Each ward has an elected ward representative or municipal councillor. For postal administration the city is divided into postal zones. The complete list of municipal wards and their locations by municipal zones are shown in the table below.

Politics

On 1 November 1956, Tripura became a Union Territory and an Advisory Committee was formed to advise the Chief Commissioner. On 15 August 1957, a Territorial Council was formed with 30 elected members and two members nominated by the government of India. On 1 July 1963, the Tripura Territorial Council was dissolved and a Legislative Assembly with the existing members of the Territorial Council was formed. Tripura is governed through a parliamentary system of representative democracy, a feature it shares with other Indian states. Universal suffrage is granted to residents. The Tripura government has three branches: executive, legislature and judiciary. The Tripura Legislative Assembly consists of elected members and special office bearers that are elected by the members. Assembly meetings are presided over by the speaker, or by the deputy speaker in the case of the speaker's absence. The Assembly is unicameral with 60 members of the Legislative Assembly (MLA).
Agartala assembly constituency is part of Tripura West. Political clashes between the Communist Party of India (Marxist) and Indian National Congress have always been common.

After the independence of India in 1947 Tripura was still a princely state. After the death of the last king Maharaja Bir Bikram Kishore Manikya Bahadur on 17 May 1947, a Regency Council was formed headed by Maharani Kanchan Prava Devi, for aid of the minor Prince, Kirit Bikram Kishore Manikya Bahadur. The regent signed the merger agreement with the government of India. After the merger Tripura became a Part 'C' state. On reorganisation of the states, effected in November 1956, Tripura became a Union Territory with an Advisory Committee to aid and advise the chief commissioner. Tripura gained its statehood on 21 January 1972 before that but merging with India in 1949 the first chief minister of the state was on 1 July 1963, Sachindra Lal Singh of the Indian National Congress, he was the CM of the state for around 3,046 days. From 5 January 1978 the rule of the Congress came to an end as Nripen Chakraborty became the first communist chief minister of Tripura. Later again the communists fell and the INC rose and was in power till 1992, from 1993 again CPI (M) came to power. Manik Sarkar was the CM of the state from 11 March 1998 to March 2018. In 2018 Tripura Legislative Assembly election BJP 36 out of 59 seats, defeating CPI(M) in the process. BJP's Biplab Kumar Deb was sworn in as the chief minister of Tripura.

Agartala is administered by several government agencies. The Agartala Municipal Corporation, or AMC, oversees and manages the civic infrastructure of the city which together encompass 49 wards. Each ward elects a councillor to the AMC. Each borough has a committee of councillors, each of whom is elected to represent a ward. By means of the borough committees, the corporation undertakes urban planning and maintains roads, government-aided schools, hospitals, and municipal markets.

Economy

Most of the population is employed in the state and central government, and other government owned enterprises.

The consumption patterns of the residents of Agartala have evolved considerably since the expansion of the city and the corresponding rise in population; previously, major consumption took place once a year, during Durga puja, while during the rest of the year consumption took place largely only for special occasions.

The Agartala Book Fair has been held annually, usually in Agartala, since 1981.

Culture

Like in other Indian states, there is mixed religion in Agartala. Hinduism is the dominant religion and there are many temples across the city. The whole city is nestled with tents catering to a variety of themes. Christianity is a widespread faith as well, with Christmas being a very busy time of the year. Agartala is also known for its tribal festivals like Kharchi, and Garia Puja.

Temples
Some prominent temples are:
 Lakshmi Narayan Temple, the Palace Compound
 Agartala Jagannath Mandir

Churches

 Union Baptist Church, Arundhutinagar, the oldest church in Agartala
 Agartala City Baptist Church, Supari Bagan
 St. Francis Xavier Cathedral Church, Durjoynagar

Transportation

Airport

Agartala is connected to other cities in India by air via Maharaja Bir Bikram Airport. There are direct flight connections to Kolkata, Imphal, Guwahati, Bangalore and New Delhi. As per AAI report, Agartala airport is the third international airport in northeast India. The airport was built in 1942 by Bir Bikram Kishore Manikya Debbarma Bahadur who was the ruler of Tripura State until 1947, and used to be called "Singerbhil Airport"; the Indian Ministry of Civil Aviation renamed the airport in 2018.  During World War II, US 4th Combat Cargo Group flew Curtiss C-46 from the airport to fly supplies over Burma.  
The major airlines are Air India, IndiGo. The airport is under construction to make it an international airport.

Plans passed to upgrade the airport building with a new terminal under construction and better facilities and modern equipment along with more apron, expansion of runways, better CAT and navigation system.

Roads
National Highway 8 connects Agartala to Assam and the rest of India by road, also known as the lifeline of Tripura. The highways (NH44, NH 44A) connect Agartala with Silchar (317 km), Guwahati (599 km), Shillong (499 km), Dharmanagar (200 km) and Aizawl (443 km). A bus service connects it to Dhaka (150 km).
 National Highway 44 (India) connected to Tripura to Shillong and Mizoram (NH 44A)
 National Highway 44A (India) connected to Tripura to Mizoram

Agartala is well connected by road to other parts of Tripura state. National Highway 44 has been extended to the south, thus improving the road connectivity between Agartala and south Tripura. Buses, Jeeps, Trekkers and SUVs are the most common public carriers, and cars and vans are usually used for private hire.
The highway passes through hilly terrains, while travelling from the city towards the North one can experience the lavishing and lush green Baramura Hill Range, Atharamura Hills and the Longtharai Hills and while moving towards the South Debatamura Hills can be seen.

The main mode of public transportation within the city consists of a network of cycle rickshaws, auto rickshaws and buses. To ease traffic congestion a 2.26 km long flyover is constructed.

Railways
Since 2008, Agartala has been connected to other cities in India by the Agartala Railway Station situated at  Dukli. The foundation stone for the 119-km Kumarghat-Agartala railway project was laid in 1996 by former prime minister H. D. Deve Gowda.

Agartala is the second capital city (after Guwahati, Assam) in the northeast which is connected to the country's railway network. The railway station is located approximately 5.5 km (2.96 nautical miles) from the heart of the city and a lot of modes of transportation are available to reach the city from the station.

Broad-gauge conversion work in the Lumding-Silchar segment was completed in March 2015. Gauge conversion work up to Agartala was completed by the end of March 2016, and railway traffic between Agartala and Silchar began. During the laying of rail lines from Kumarghat to Agartala, provisions were kept for swiftly converting it to broad gauge. Presently, local trains from Agartala to Dharmanagar and Silchar are functional. Work on express trains connecting Agartala to Delhi, Kolkata, Guwahati and Dibrugarh has started. Local railway traffic between Agartala to Sabroom has become functional.

Connecting with Tripura Train Rajdhani, Shatabdi, Janshatabdi, Garib Rath, Duronto, Yuva, AC Trains.
A rail link between Agartala and Akhaura in Bangladesh was approved by the government of India in September 2011. IRCON is constructing this 15 km long track that will directly connect northeast India to Chittagong international sea port. The TripuraSundari Express and Rajdhani Express are two Super Fast weekly trains connecting Agartala to Anand Vihar Terminal, Delhi. Other trains like Deoghar express (weekly), Kanchanjungha Express to Sealdah runs four days a week, Agartala-Habibganj weekly special train and Bengaluru bound Bi-weekly Humsafar Express connects the city to the states of Assam, West Bengal, Bihar, Jharkhand, Madhya Pradesh, Uttar Pradesh, Odisha, Andhra Pradesh, Tamil Nadu and Karnataka.

Communications

Radio stations
 AIR
 Big FM
 Red FM 93.5

Television
Doordarshan (DD) has a television station in Agartala. Akash Tripura is one of the first television channels in Agartala. It is a full-time Agartala-based news channel. Other full-time based channels are PB 24, Headlines Tripura, Akash Tripura, News Vanguard and Focus Tripura etc.

There are other cable channels such as Hallabol, Sristi Tripura, Sristi Music, Sristi Bangla, Sristi Cinema, CITI, News All India, and Tripura Pratidin, which are not 24 hours channels and are run by Siti and Sristi Cable networks.

There are also KokBorok channels like KokTripura, KhumpuiTV and ChiniKhorangTV Which are currently in service.

Newspapers
Bengali-language media is dominant in the city. Major news publications are:
 Dainik Sambad (Bengali)
 Syandhan Patrika (Bengali)
 Ajker Fariad (Bengali)
 Bartaman (Bengali)
 Daily Desher Katha (Bengali)
 Aajkaal (Bengali)'
 Pratibadi Kalam (Bengali)
 Kok Tripura (Kokborok)
 Hachukni Kok (Kokborok)

Education

Universities
 Tripura University is Agartala's central university, located in a 10 km range from the city of Agartala. Other universities include the ICFAI University, which was established in 2004 and is ranked 2nd in the Engineering Colleges of India. The Maharaja Bir Bikram University is known as the only state university within Tripura. The Sikkim Manipal University has been ranked 13th in India's best medical universities by India Today as well as being in the top 10 emerging colleges of India.

Colleges
There are currently 15 general colleges within Argatala including the Bir Bikram Memorial College, the Ramthakur College and the Women's College, Agartala which was established in 1965 and is the only existing college for women within the capital city. 
Colleges with a specific academic focus within Argatala include the Tripura Government Law College which provides a five year Bachelor of Law Degree for its students. Argatala is also home to numerous technical colleges including the National Institute of Technology, Agartala and the Tripura Institute of Technology.

Prominent schools
The prominent primary and secondary schools of Agartala include the St Paul's School, Agartala which has an aim to teach students who are apart of the Christian Faith. A similar school, the Holy Cross School, was established by the Congregation of Holy Cross. Other prominent schools include the Shishu Bihar H.S. School and the Netaji Subhash Vidyaniketan.

Sports

Tripura is an important state in the northeast India with regard to sports. Cricket is the most important sport in the state. Football also has an important role.

Football
Agartala has a large base of football followers. UK mini stadium is an important venue for this game. Tripura Football Association organises a football league known as Agartala League every year to popularise the sport in the state.

Cricket

Tripura has a state team which plays under the auspices of the Tripura Cricket Association in the Eastern division of the Ranji Trophy championship, the national first-class cricket competition of India. The most important cricket grounds are Maharaja Bir Bikram College Stadium and Polytechnic Institute Ground, Narsingarh. Some other notable grounds are Astabal ground and the Pragati School cricket ground. Tripura Cricket Association organises cricket tournaments at the U-13, U-15, U-17 and U-19 levels where clubs affiliated to Tripura Cricket Association compete against each other.

Stadiums

The following are the stadiums in Agartala:
 Maharaja Bir Bikram College Stadium the premier cricket stadium in the city with a capacity of 30,000 persons.
 Polytechnic Institute Ground- the second cricket stadium in the city with capacity of 15,000 persons.
 Swami Vivekananda Stadium another multi-purpose stadium in the capital city of Tripura in Agartala. Located around 2 km away from the city centre, the stadium has a sitting capacity around 8000 including a grand stand and press gallery. The area of the inner ground is 7350 sqm. It is considered the most highly modernised and the best stadium in northeast India.

Tourism

Places of interest

 College Tilla Maharaja Bir Bikram College, Tripura University buildings, football ground, international cricket stadium, picturesque lush landscapes and serene natural lakes. It is also a national bird sanctuary.
 Ujjayanta Palace Palace of the Tripura kings, was converted to state legislative assembly and now into a museum, situated in the area of Palace Compound is one of the eye catching attraction in the state. It is a former royal palace in Agartala, and also served as the meeting place of the Tripura Legislative Assembly until 2011. The area has decoded from the ruling landmark of the kings to the citizens. Tours are conducted by the Tripura Tourism Department. The name Ujjayanta Palace was given by the poet Rabindranath Tagore, who visited the state of Tripura many times. Maharaja Bir Bikram was the last king of Tripura and the last king who stayed in his house in the palace. It has now been transformed into a museum named Ujjayanta Museum and it was inaugurated by Dr.Hamid Ansari, the former vice president of India
 Agartala Jagannath Mandir — Hindu temple of the Vaishnava school of thought.

Parks and playgrounds

 Heritage Park: The most visited of all the parks in the city, the most notable features here are the miniature models of various monuments of the state, the Ayurvedic herb-garden and the fountain.
 Rabindra Kanan: A park in the vicinity of the Pushpavanta Palace, former Raj Bhavan of Tripura and the Malancha Nivas, this park annually holds the birth anniversary ceremony of Rabindranath Tagore, after whom the park is named. It is near to Heritage Park.
Vivek Uddyan: Adjacent to Ujjayanta Palace and Children's Park, this park annually holds the birth anniversary ceremony of Swami Vivekananda, after whom the park is named
Nehru Park: A stroll or walking park that is decorated in greenery with rivers (no mechanical themed-machinery), close in driving distance from Heritage Park and Rabindra kanan.
Children's Park
Albert Ekka Park
Lembucherra Park: The latest addition to Agartala's parks

Museums

 Tripura State Museum, located at the Ujjayanta Palace
 Science Museum, located in Sukanta Academy
 Haveli Museum, located in Khayerpur

Multiplexes
Rupasi Multiplex: One of the established multi-screen cinemas in Agartala is the Rupasi Cinema, ML Plaza, Agartala.
Balaka Cinema: Located in the City Center Agartala.

Notable people

 Maharaja Bir Bikram Kishore Manikya Debbarma Bahadur, King of Tripura State. Often considered the Architect of Modern Tripura
 Nanda Kumar Deb Barma, Tripuri language playwright, poet and lyricist.
 Pradyot Bikram Manikya Deb Barma
 S. D. Burman, music director, singer and composer in Bengali and Hindi language films
 Biplab Kumar Deb, 10th Chief Minister of Tripura.
 N. C. Debbarma, Former AIR Director, politician, current IPFT Chief and Revenue Minister of Tripura.
 Sourabhee Debbarma, singer (winner of Indian Idol 4)
 Kalpana Debnath, gymnast
 Mantu Debnath, gymnast
 Reema Debnath, actress in Bollywood
 Somdev Devvarman, professional Indian tennis player
 Manik Dey, member of the Communist Party of India (Marxist), former minister of Power, Urban Development, Rural Development and Transport in Government of Tripura
 David Dhawan, Bollywood film director
 Chandra Shekhar Ghosh, founder of Bandhan Bank
 Dipa Karmakar, gymnast. Represented India at 2016 Summer Olympics
 Borkung Hrangkhawl, rapper, singer, songwriter
 Naresh Mitra, Bengali actor and director
 Manisankar Murasingh, cricketer
 Bishweshwar Nandi, gymnast
 Jishnu Dev Varma, politician and Deputy Chief Minister of Tripura

See also
 List of cities and towns in Tripura
 Tourism in North East India
 Centre for Forest Based Livelihood and Extension
 Advanced Research Centre for Bamboo and Rattan

References

External links

 Agartala Municipal Corporation
 

 
Articles containing potentially dated statements from 2004
All articles containing potentially dated statements
Cities and towns in West Tripura district
West Tripura district
Tourism in Northeast India
Indian capital cities